The 3rd Congress of the Philippines (Filipino: Ikatlong Kongreso ng Pilipinas), composed of the Philippine Senate and House of Representatives, met from January 25, 1954, until December 10, 1957, during the 39-month presidency of Ramon Magsaysay and the first nine months of Carlos P. García's presidency.

Sessions
First Regular Session: January 25 – May 20, 1954
First Special Session: July 19 – August 3, 1954
Second Regular Session: January 24 – May 19, 1955
Second Special Session: July 7 – August 10, 1955
Third Regular Session: January 23 – May 17, 1956
Third Special Session: June 21 – July 25, 1956
Fourth Regular Session: January 28, 1957 – May 23, 1957
Joint Session: December 10, 1957

Legislation
The Third Congress passed a total of 1,077 laws. (Republic Act Nos. 973 – 2049)

Major Legislation

Leadership

Senate
President of the Senate:
Eulogio A. Rodriguez, Sr. (NP)
Senate President Pro-Tempore:
Manuel C. Briones (NP)
Majority Floor Leader:
Cipriano P. Primicias, Sr. (NP)
Minority Floor Leader:
Lorenzo M. Tañada (CP)

House of Representatives
Speaker:
José B. Laurel, Jr. (NP, 3rd District Batangas)
Speaker Pro-Tempore:
Daniel Z. Romualdez (NP, 4th District Leyte)
Majority Floor Leader:
Arturo M. Tolentino (NP, 3rd District Manila)
Minority Floor Leader:
Eugenio Pérez (LP, 2nd District Pangasinan)

Members

Senate

Notes

House of Representatives

See also
Congress of the Philippines
Senate of the Philippines
House of Representatives of the Philippines
1953 Philippine general election
1955 Philippine general election

External links

Further reading
Philippine House of Representatives Congressional Library

03
Third Philippine Republic